Ruth Kobart (April 24, 1924 – December 14, 2002) was an American performer, whose six-decade career encompassed opera, Broadway musical theatre, regional theatre, films, and television.

Life and career
Born as Ruth Maxine Kahn in Des Moines, Iowa, Kobart studied opera at the American Conservatory of Music in Chicago and made her professional debut as the Witch in an off-Broadway production of Engelbert Humperdinck's Hänsel und Gretel.

She frequently toured with the NBC Opera Theatre (NBCOT) and the New York City Opera (NYCO). With the NBCOT she notably created the role of Agata in the world premiere of Gian Carlo Menotti's Maria Golovin at the Expo '58 in Brussels on August 20, 1958; later the same year she portrayed the role on Broadway. For the NBC, she also created the role of Arina in the premiere of Bohuslav Martinů's The Marriage. She played Madame Pace in the world premiere of Hugo Weisgall's Six Characters in Search of an Author at the NYCO in 1959. Regarding her role as Madame Pernelle in Tartuffe at the Geary Theater, she wrote: "I had a big voice and a big body ... I came out on stage and shouted my head off, and believe it or not, I found my way."

In 1955, Kobart made her Broadway debut in the chorus of Rodgers and Hammerstein's Pipe Dream. She understudied leading lady Helen Traubel and played her role forty two times during the show's run. Additional Broadway credits included How to Succeed in Business Without Really Trying, A Funny Thing Happened on the Way to the Forum, A Flea in Her Ear, and Three Sisters. She was nominated for the 1963 Tony Award for Best Featured Actress in a Musical for Forum.

Kobart's association with San Francisco's American Conservatory Theater began with its first season in 1967 and lasted through 1994. Her appearances with them included The House of Bernarda Alba, Sunday in the Park with George, Arsenic and Old Lace, A Little Night Music, and Home.

In the 1970s she took an extended leave from the company to portray Nurse Ratched in the 18-month-long San Francisco production of One Flew Over the Cuckoo's Nest. Her national tour credits included Forty Carats,
The Last of the Red Hot Lovers, and Annie. Her portrayal of Miss Hannigan on the first tour of Annie and in a long Chicago run (in succession to originator Dorothy Loudon) was considered one of the best interpretations of that classic role.

She voiced the main villain, Malicia, in 1994 video game King's Quest VII.

Films and television
On screen she appeared in the feature film adaptation of How to Succeed, as well as Petulia, Dirty Harry, The Hindenburg, and Sister Act and Sister Act 2: Back in the Habit. Her television credits include a regular role on Bob (which starred Bob Newhart) and guest appearances on The Streets of San Francisco, CHiPs, Archie Bunker's Place, St. Elsewhere, Matt Houston, Remington Steele, Midnight Caller, and Murphy Brown.  One of her more memorable roles was portraying the hijacked school bus driver in Dirty Harry.

Death
Kobart died of pancreatic cancer at her home in San Francisco, California, aged 78, seven months after being diagnosed with the illness. She was  survived by her brother, Howard S. Kahn, and various nephews and nieces.

Filmography

References

External links
 
 
 Obituary
 Ruth Kobart ACT profile
 Notice of Kobart's death

1924 births
2002 deaths
American stage actresses
American musical theatre actresses
American film actresses
American television actresses
Deaths from cancer in California
Deaths from pancreatic cancer
Actresses from Des Moines, Iowa
Actresses from San Francisco
Musicians from Des Moines, Iowa
Singers from Iowa
20th-century American women opera singers
20th-century American actresses